Streamline is the fourth studio album by drummer Lenny White, released in 1978 by Elektra Records. The album reached No. 27 on the Billboard Top Jazz Albums chart.

Critical reception

Alex Henderson at AllMusic gave Streamline three stars out of five, saying that it "isn't a five-star gem, but it isn't bad either" and calling it a "generally decent, if mildly uneven, collection of instrumental jazz fusion and R&B vocal numbers." He noted White's cover of the Beatles' "Lady Madonna" as an "interesting" highlight; other songs such as "Night Games", "Struttin'" and "Pooh Bear" he described as "enjoyable even though they fall short of the brilliance of the material on The Adventures of Astral Pirates [1978] and Venusian Summer [1975]."

Track listing

Personnel
Lenny White – drums, percussion, production
Chaka Khan – lead vocals (track 2)
Dianne Reeves – vocals (track 4), background vocals
Don Blackman – vocals (track 6), keyboard, Minimoog (track 4), synthesizer (track 7), Rhodes piano (track 10), piano (track 11), organ (track 3)
Nick Moroch – guitar (except tracks 1, 3, 10)
Jamie Glaser – guitar (tracks 1, 3, 10)
Denzil Miller Jr. – keyboard (track 8), Minimoog (track 9), rhythm arrangement (track 2)
Larry Dunn – Minimoog (track 1), synthesizer programming, production
Marcus Miller – bass
Chris Brunt – engineering
Richard Kaplan – engineering
Steve Hirsch – engineering
Don Mizell – executive production

Chart performance

References

Lenny White albums
1978 albums
Albums produced by Lenny White
Elektra Records albums